This is a demography of the population of Uruguay including population density, ethnicity, education level, health of the populace, economic status, religious affiliations and other aspects of the population.

Population

The proportion of children below the age of 15 in 2015 was 21.4%, 64.2% was between 15 and 65 years of age, while 14.4% was 65 years or older.

Structure of the population 

Structure of the population (04.10.2011) (Census):

Vital statistics

UN estimates
The Population Department of the United Nations prepared the following estimates for Uruguay.

Total fertility rate (1880–1899)
The total fertility rate is the number of children born per woman. It is based on fairly good data for the entire period. Sources: Our World In Data and Gapminder Foundation.

Births and deaths

Current vital statistics

Origins and ethnicity 

Uruguayans share a Spanish linguistic and heavily Spanish cultural background with its neighbour Argentina. Most Uruguayans are descended from colonial-era settlers and immigrants from Europe with almost 96% of the population being of either sole or partial European descent, with a majority of these being Spaniards, followed closely by Italians, and smaller numbers of French, Germans, Portuguese, British (English or Scots), Irish, Swiss, Russians, Poles, Bulgarians, Hungarians, Ukrainians, Lithuanians, Estonians, Latvians, Swedes, Danes, Dutch, Belgians, Austrians, Croats, Serbs, Greeks and others.

There are also smaller numbers of Western Asian (Turks, Israelis, and Lebanese) and Caucasian ethnic groups (Armenians, Georgians, and Azeris).

Many Swiss settlements (colonias or "colonies"), such as Colonia Suiza, Colonia Valdense and Nueva Helvecia, were founded in the department of Colonia. Also, there are towns founded by early British settlers, such as Conchillas and Barker. A Russian colony called San Javier is found in the department of Río Negro. There are Mennonite colonies in the department of Río Negro and in the department of Canelones.

Many of the European immigrants arrived in the late 19th century and have heavily influenced the architecture and culture of Montevideo and other major cities. For this reason, Montevideo and life within the city are very reminiscent of Western Europe.

The rest of the Uruguayan population is Black/Afro-Uruguayan of African descent and about 1 or 2% are of Asian descent, mostly are Lebanese/Syrian Arab, and Chinese or Japanese ancestry.

Amerindians descendants make up a small population in the Rural North region, with Mestizos making up 6% of the population.

Demographic distribution 

Metropolitan Montevideo, with about one and a half million inhabitants, is the capital and largest city. The rest of the urban population lives in about 20 towns.

Uruguay is distinguished by its high literacy rate (97.3%) and a large urban middle class.

As a result of the low birth rate, high life expectancy, and relatively high rate of emigration of younger people, Uruguay's population is quite mature. In 2006, the country had a birth rate of 13.91 births per thousand population, lower than neighboring countries Argentina (16.73 births/1000 population)[3] and Brazil (16.56 births/1,000 population).

Emigration

During the past four decades, an estimated 500,000 Uruguayans had emigrated, principally to Brazil, Argentina and Europe. (Argentina is the main destination for Uruguayans, but they are also drawn to Spain, the United Kingdom, Italy, France and Germany.) Other Uruguayans went to various countries in Europe, Australia and the USA.

Neighboring ties and short distances between Uruguayan cities and Argentine capital Buenos Aires, have drawn a path of success for very talented Uruguayans who settled in the neighbor country and became famous and locally accepted. Some famous Uruguayans who excelled in Argentina are entrepreneur and financier Juan Navarro, sports journalist Victor Hugo Morales, singer and actress Natalia Oreiro, soccer players Antonio Alzamendi, Enzo Francescoli and Carlos Goyen, actor Daniel Hendler, actress China Zorrilla, entertainer Carlos Perciavalle and former playboy and journalist Luis César Avilés.

Emigration to the United States also rose at the beginning of the century, but remains a small part of the US population. The majority of Uruguayans in the US live in New York City, New Jersey, Washington, D.C., Florida, and urban areas of California.

Religion

Uruguay has no official religion, church and state are officially separated, and religious freedom is guaranteed. A 2008 survey by the Instituto Nacional de Estadística of Uruguay gave Catholicism as the main religion, with 45.7% of the population, 9.0% are non-Catholic Christians, 0.6% are Animists or Umbandists (an Afro-Brazilian religion) and 0.4% Jewish. 30.1% reported believing in a god, but not belonging to any religion, while 14% were Atheist or Agnostic. Among the sizeable Armenian community in Montevideo the dominant religion is Christianity, specifically Armenian Apostolic.

Political observers consider Uruguay the most secular country in the Americas. Uruguay's secularization began with the relatively minor role of the church in the colonial era, compared with other parts of the Spanish Empire. The small numbers of Uruguay's Indians and their fierce resistance to proselytism reduced the influence of the ecclesiastical authorities.

After independence, anticlerical ideas spread to Uruguay, particularly from France, further eroding the influence of the church. In 1837, civil marriage was recognized and in 1861 the state took over the running of public cemeteries. In 1907, divorce was legalized and in 1909, all religious instruction was banned from state schools. Under the influence of the Colorado reformer José Batlle y Ordóñez (1903–1911) complete separation of church and state was introduced with the new constitution of 1917.

Demographic statistics 
Demographic statistics according to the World Population Review in 2019.

One birth every 11 minutes
One death every 16 minutes
One net migrant every 180 minutes
Net gain of one person every 42 minutes

Demographic statistics according to the CIA World Factbook, unless otherwise indicated.

Population 
3,369,299 (July 2014 est.)
3,400,425 (July 2018 est.)
3,416,264 (2023 est.)

Note: The 2011 Census of the National Statistics Institute of Uruguay began in September 2011 and the preliminary results, stating population of departments, were announced in December 2011. Final results with numbers for localities were still pending as of 26 June 2012.

Age structure

0-14 years: 19.91% (male 341,402 /female 329,474)
15-24 years: 15.56% (male 265,486 /female 258,611)
25-54 years: 39.48% (male 658,871 /female 671,172)
55-64 years: 10.68% (male 169,385 /female 190,392)
65 years and over: 14.38% (male 194,269 /female 290,237) (2018 est.)

Median age 
total: 35.5 years. Country comparison to the world: 82nd
male: 33.8 years
female: 37.3 years (2020 est.)

total: 33.6 years
male: 32 years
female: 35.2 years (2011 est.)

Life expectancy at birth

total population: 78.66 years. Country comparison to the world: 71th
male: 75.58 years
female: 81.86 years (2023 est.)

Urbanization 
urban population: 95.8% of total population (2023)
rate of urbanization: 0.4% annual rate of change (2020-25 est.)

Sex ratio 
 at birth: 1.04 male(s)/female
 under 15 years: 1.04 male(s)/female
 15–64 years: 0.98 male(s)/female
 65 years and over: 0.68 male(s)/female
 total population: 0.94 male(s)/female (2023 est.)

HIV/AIDS – adult prevalence rate 
0.5% (2009 est.)

HIV/AIDS – people living with HIV/AIDS 
9,900 (2009 est.)

HIV/AIDS – deaths 
fewer than 500 (2007 est.)

Racial groups

Languages 
Spanish, Portuguese, Uruguayan Sign Language.

There are other ethnic minorities speaking their original languages: Italian, Catalan, German, etc.

Literacy 
definition:''' age 15 and over can read and write
total population: 98.6%
male: 98.2%
female: 99% (2017 est.)

total population: 98%
male: 97.6%
female: 98.4% (2003 est.)

School life expectancy (primary to tertiary education) 
 total: 16 years
 male: 14 years
 female: 17 years (2008)

Unemployment, youth ages 15-24
total: 23.8%. Country comparison to the world: 52nd
male: 20.2%
female: 28.7% (2016 est.)

Education expenditures 
4.5% of GDP (2008)

See also

 Emigration from Uruguay
 Immigration to Uruguay
 Uruguayan people

Notes

References